Irvine Clifton Gardner (1889 – December 29, 1972) was president of the Optical Society of America in 1958.

See also
Optical Society of America#Past Presidents of the OSA

References

External links
Articles Published by early OSA Presidents  Journal of the Optical Society of America

Presidents of Optica (society)
American physicists
1972 deaths
1889 births
Date of birth missing